Swansea NHS Trust was an NHS Trust covering Swansea, south Wales.  It was established on 1 April 1999 and ceased to exist on 1 April 2008 when it merged with Bro Morgannwg NHS Trust to form the Abertawe Bro Morgannwg University NHS Trust (ABM). The trust managed nine hospitals and provides over 1,800 beds.  In addition, it provided healthcare from number of community premises.  Swansea NHS Trust was a designated university trust.

Major Hospitals

General hospitals
Morriston Hospital
Singleton Hospital

Psychiatric
Cefn Coed Hospital

Division of Medicine and Elderly Care
Fairwood Hospital
Garngoch Hospital
Gellinudd Hospital
Gorseinon Hospital
Hill House Hospital

Community
Clydach War Memorial Hospital, closed in 2015.

External links
Swansea NHS Trust (official site)

History of Swansea
Defunct Welsh NHS Trusts
1999 establishments in Wales
2008 disestablishments in Wales